Rebecca Valadez is a Latina singer, actress, and former member of the Tejano group, Mazz. She performed on the group's 2002 Latin Grammy award-winning album, Siempre Humilde. Her solo album, Rebecca Valadez, under AMI Records Latin was nominated as "Best Tejano Album"  for the 2006 Grammy Awards. Valadez was a backup singer on Janet Jackson's 1998-1999 Velvet Rope concert tour and played the lead role in matinee performances of the 2000 musical Selena Forever.

References

External links 
 * Personal web site of Rebecca Valadez

Living people
Grammy Award winners
American women singers
Spanish-language singers of the United States
Tejano musicians
Year of birth missing (living people)
21st-century American women
Women in Latin music